Institute of Economics may refer to:

Institute of Economics, Academia Sinica in Taiwan
Institute of Economics (Poland)
Institute of Economics of the Polish Academy of Sciences
Max Planck Institute of Economics in Germany
Institute of Economics in the U.S. which became part of the Brookings Institution in 1927